Garland Gbelle (born 16 December 1992) is a French professional footballer who plays as a midfielder for Ligue 2 club Quevilly-Rouen.

Career
Gbelle trained with Cercle Paul-Bert Bréqugny-Rennes and started his senior career with Dinan-Léhon FC at the fifth level of French football in 2012. Noticed as part of the team which progressed to the last 64 of the 2014–15 Coupe de France, he was signed by Championnat National side Luçon FC in the summer of 2015. When the club went bankrupt in the summer of 2016, he signed for Les Herbiers at the same level. In the summer of 2017 he moved to a third National club, Cholet. 

On 18 June 2018, Gbelle signed his first professional contract with Paris FC in Ligue 2. Gbelle made his professional debut with Paris FC in a 0–0 (4–3) Coupe de la Ligue penalty shootout win over AC Ajaccio on 14 August 2018. In June 2019, he left the club, having not made a single appearance in the league, re-signing for Cholet on a two-year deal, with an optional extension of one year should the club win promotion.

After Cholet failed to challenge for promotion during the 2019–20 season, Gbelle left to seek promotion with SC Lyon in June 2020. SC Lyon would go on to finish last in the Championnat National in the 2020–21 season, being the only team to suffer relegation.

On 9 June 2021, Gbelle signed for recently-promoted Ligue 2 side Quevilly-Rouen.

Personal life
Born in France, Gbelle is of Ivorian descent.

References

External links
 
 

1992 births
Living people
Sportspeople from Montbéliard
French footballers
French sportspeople of Ivorian descent
Association football midfielders
Paris FC players
Luçon FC players
Les Herbiers VF players
SO Cholet players
Lyon La Duchère players
US Quevilly-Rouen Métropole players
Championnat National players
Championnat National 3 players
Footballers from Bourgogne-Franche-Comté